Pycnarmon praeruptalis is a moth in the family Crambidae. It was described by Julius Lederer in 1863. It is found on Indonesia's Ambon Island and Papua New Guinea.

References

Spilomelinae
Moths described in 1863
Moths of Indonesia
Moths of New Guinea